Marco Kottmann (born 27 January 1980) is a Swiss professional footballer who plays as a midfielder for SC Cham. His previous clubs include FC Lucerne, SC Kriens and FC Schötz.

External icons
 ZeroZero.pt

1980 births
Living people
Swiss men's footballers
SC Cham players
FC Luzern players
Association football midfielders